Pianello Val Tidone is a comune (municipality) in the Province of Piacenza in the Italian region Emilia-Romagna, located about  northwest of Bologna and about  southwest of Piacenza.  

Pianello Val Tidone borders the following municipalities: Agazzano, Alta Val Tidone, Borgonovo Val Tidone,   Piozzano.

Main sights
Sights include:
 Municipal Castle (Rocca)
Rocca d'Olgisio, a castle originally built on a spur outside the town in the 9th century and used by the Dal verme family of lords and condottieri.
Church of San Maurizio and San Colombano (1250, enlarged in 1377)
Archaeological Museum of Val Tidone

Culture
Pianello Val Tidone yearly hosts the Val Tidone International Music Events, with international instrumental and composition competitions.

References

Cities and towns in Emilia-Romagna